The Fábrica Argentina de Aviones SA (FAdeA), officially Fábrica Argentina de Aviones "Brigadier San Martín" S.A., is Argentina's main aircraft manufacturer. Founded on 10 October 1927 and located in Córdoba, for most of its existence it was known as Fábrica Militar de Aviones (FMA), until its privatization in the 1990s to Lockheed Martin. In 2009 the concession ended and the company is now wholly owned by the Argentine government.

History

 
Formed on 10 October 1927 and on 18 July 1928 ends the construction and testing begins on the track the first domestically produced aircraft: the license built Avro 504 Gosport training aircraft equipped with a  Gnome engine. It had a speed of 140 km/h with a flying endurance of 2 hours. A series of indigenous and foreign designs followed, mostly for military use.

The factory is known for producing the first jet fighter aircraft in Latin America: the Pulqui I (1947) and the Pulqui II (1950) under the direction of engineers Emile Dewoitine (French) and Kurt Tank (German) respectively.

In the 1960s produced the Guarani light transport and the Pucara COIN aircraft, followed by the Pampa jet trainer in the 1980s; the last two still in service with the Argentine Air Force as of early 2016.

Privatization (1995)
In 1995, FMA was privatized by the government of Carlos Menem and from that year until March 2009 it operated as a concession to LAASA (Lockheed Aircraft Argentina SA, a subsidiary of Lockheed Martin Corporation). Under the terms of the privatization agreement LAASA would operate it for 25 years, which could be renewed for two 10 year periods.

During this period the activity was mostly focused in maintenance and upgrades of existing aircraft in service with the Argentine Air Force.

Nationalization (2010)
During the government of Cristina Fernández de Kirchner the factory was nationalized in August 2009, with compensation of ARS $67 million paid. The text of the expropriation law provides that "the State cannot divest itself of majority shareholdings or the power to make decisions at the factory."

It was renamed after Argentine Air Force Brigadier :es:Juan Ignacio San Martín a military engineer who laid the foundations of the aeronautics industry  at Córdoba  when he directed the Instituto Aerotécnico, the forerunner of the FMA, in the 1940s.

The United States Department of State announced that effective 18 December 2009, Lockheed Martin Aircraft Argentina would be renamed to Fábrica Argentina de Aviones "Brigadier San Martin" S.A. and divested to the Government of Argentina.

Aircraft design and production

The FMA has produced innovative aircraft prototypes, but the state of the Argentine economy has usually prevented most of them from entering large-scale production. Nevertheless the FMA has managed to put several aircraft types of more conventional designs into full productions. It also engaged in production of licensed aircraft from other countries.

The prefixes used for the aircraft locally developed (and produced) are:
 Ae, for "Dirección General de Aerotécnica", on the first period (1927–1936);
 F.M.A., for "Fábrica Militar de Aviones", on the second period (1938–1943);
 I.Ae., for "Instituto Aerotécnico", on the third period (1943–1952);
 IA, meaning not specified, on the fourth (current) period (1952 to present).

List of aircraft manufactured, projected, or upgraded

Gallery

Local designs

Manufactured under license

Engines

See also
 Other aircraft manufacturers in Argentina
 Aero Boero
 Chincul
 Cicaré Helicópteros
 LAVIASA

References

Notes

Bibliography

Further reading
  FÁBRICA MILITAR DE AVIONES: CRÓNICAS Y TESTIMONIOS, retrieved 2010-01-18 (PDF file available for download). Published in 2007 by Ministerio de Ciencia y Tecnología de la Provincia de Córdoba, Argentina (Córdoba's Province Science and Technology Ministry)
  La Argentina fabricante de Aviones (retrieved 2016-04-23)

External links

 
 "Argentina's FAdeA Mulls Major Changes" - Jane's IHS
 FMA history
 Aeromilitaria.com.ar 
 "Former Lockheed Martin Argentina plant relaunched as FAdeA" FlightGlobal

 
Government-owned companies of Argentina
Aircraft manufacturers of Argentina
Argentine Air Force
Defense companies of Argentina
Former Lockheed Martin companies